Hockey Club Amur, commonly referred to as the Amur Khabarovsk, is a Russian professional ice hockey team based in Khabarovsk. They are members of the Chernyshev Division of the Kontinental Hockey League (KHL). Located in the Russian Far East, the team takes its name from the Amur River, and plays its home games at the Platinum Arena.

History
Amur Khabarovsk was founded in 1966 as SKA Khabarovsk; it only adopted its current name in 1996, a name that comes from the nearby river Amur. By its location in the Russian Far East, the team is pretty isolated from every other team in the KHL, making rivalries difficult; the nearest KHL team is Admiral Vladivostok.

For a long time a lower division dweller, Khabarovsk won the championship of the Soviet League Division 3 in 1989, earning promotion to the upper level. The team played regular season games known as the "Red Army" against West Coast Hockey League teams for the 1995–96 and 1996–97 seasons.

In 1996, Khabarovsk promoted to the Russian Superleague. A relegation to the Vysshaya Liga occurred in 2004 when the mining company that funds the club had financial difficulties. The Tigers could promote back to the top level in 2006. That same financial crisis forced the team's reserve squad, the Golden Amur Khabarovsk, to withdraw from the Asia League where it played for the 2004-05 season. The team could finish the season and take part in the playoffs, however; they finished third in regular season standings and failed to reach the playoffs finals.

In 2008, Khabarovsk was one of the 24 founding members of the Kontinental Hockey League. The team played the league's inaugural game on September 2 against Dinamo Riga at home in front of a sell-out crowd of 7,100 people. They lost, 4-2 to the Latvian team. Riga and the Tigers were playing back-to-back games in Khabarovsk, however, and on the second match, Amur won 7-6 in a tied game that went to shootouts. But the 2008-09 didn't prove to be very successful for the Tigers. The team was plagued with injuries - in October only, 11 players were side-lined, including imports Kyle Wanvig and Bryce Lampman. The Tigers needed to strengthen their squad, and therefore offered a contract to Carolina Hurricanes's Matt Murley, which resulted in a controversy sometimes compared to Alexander Radulov's, even though there are many differences. Murley's signing didn't prove beneficial for Amur though, as he only contributed 8 points to a fairly impotent offence that scored only 111 goals. Veterans Oleg Belkin and Peter Nylander were Amur's top goal scorers with 11 goals each; Belkin was top scorer with a meager 24 points in 50 games. Amur's defence was better, with regular defencemen Vasily Turkovsky and Viktor Kostyuchenok even managing to finish the season with a +3 and +2 record, respectively. But overall, the season was disappointing for the Tigers, with a 20th place, 15 wins and 60 points.

Things barely improved in 2009-10. Amur finished 21st, out of playoffs again, this time again with 60 points and only 12 wins in regular time (plus three in overtime and six in the shootouts). Former Montreal Canadiens' and Columbus Blue Jackets' David Ling did the best in offense with 32 points, while Alexei Kopeikin and Ruslan Khasanshin were the best goal scorers with respectively 16 and 14 goals. All in all, it is only 129 goals that the team scored, 18 better than the previous season, but still fourth worst in the league. Oleg Belkin had to miss the whole season, while Peter Nylander left the team after ten game to go back in Sweden, joining Timrå IK of the Elitserien. The defence was not as solid as the previous season, with Turkovsky retired and Kostyuchenok traded to HC Spartak Moscow after 14 games. The result was 187 goals against, 29 more than the previous season. Former NHL veteran and Stanley Cup winner Nolan Pratt ended up being the fourth defenceman on the team in icetime and finished the season with 11 points and a -14 +/- rating.

Season-by-season KHL record
Note: GP = Games played, W = Wins, L = Losses, T = Ties, OTL = Overtime/shootout losses, Pts = Points, GF = Goals for, GA = Goals against

Players

Current roster

Franchise records and leaders

Scoring leaders

These are the top-ten point-scorers in franchise history in the KHL. Note: Pos = Position; GP = Games played; G = Goals; A = Assists; Pts = Points; P/G = Points per game; bold = current Amur player

Team awards and honors

Winners
 Motor Cup (České Budějovice) (1): 2019

Runners-up
 KHL Cup of Hope (1): 2013

References

External links
  

 
Ice hockey teams in Russia
Sport in Khabarovsk
Kontinental Hockey League teams
Chernyshev Division (KHL)